The Tejano Music Award for Song of the Year is an honor presented annually at the Tejano Music Awards, whose mission is to recognize the most talented performers of the genre. Songs nominated for the category are also eligible to be nominated for Single of the Year, and genre-specific categories Tejano Crossover, Mexican Regional Song, and Tejano Country Song of the Year. The only English-language recording to have won the award (and to be nominated) was "Oh Girl" by La Mafia in 1983, which was included on Honey, which also won Album of the Year.

Mazz is the most awarded group with nine wins, while Elida Reyna is the most awarded female singer with seven wins.

Recipients

See also 

Music of Texas

References

General

Specific

External links
Official site of the Tejano Music Awards

S
Regional Mexican songs
Awards established in 1981